Peter Rodger (born 1964/1965) is a British filmmaker and photographer. Rodger is known for his 2009 documentary film Oh My God, as well as his work as a second unit director on The Hunger Games (2012). Rodger has won a number of awards, including from the Houston International Film Festival, the Chicago International Film Festival, the Telly Awards, the Mobius Awards, and the US International Film and Video Festival.

Personal life
Rodger was born in either 1964 or 1965 as the second son of British photojournalist George Rodger and his American assistant wife, Lois "Jinx" Rodger (née Witherspoon). Through his mother, he is a distant cousin of American actress Reese Witherspoon.

Rodger married Li Chin Tye, a Malaysian Chinese nurse who worked on film sets and later a research assistant for a film company. They had two children, Elliot and Georgia.

In  1996, Peter moved together with his family from the United Kingdom to California. In 1998, he divorced his wife, Li-Chin Tye.

In 1999, after his divorce, Rodger married Moroccan actress Soumaya Akaaboune, with whom he had a third child, Jazz.

In 2014, his eldest son, Elliot Rodger, murdered six people and injured fourteen others in Isla Vista, California, then killed himself.

Filmography

References

External links

Living people
1965 births
British people of Scottish descent
British people of German descent
British people of American descent
British documentary film directors
Photographers from Kent
British expatriates in the United States
People from Tenterden